Neveal Hackshaw (born 21 September 1995) is a Trinidadian professional footballer who plays as a defender for the Trinidad and Tobago national team.

Career

Youth and college
Hackshaw played on the collegiate level at Arima North Secondary.

Professional
Hackshaw played for North East Stars F.C. in the TT Pro League since season 2014/2015 and scored 2 goals in his first season.

In 2016, Hackshaw signed with American club Charleston Battery.

On 13 December 2018, Hackshaw was signed by Indy Eleven. He was released by Indy Eleven on November 30, 2022, following the conclusion of the 2022 season.

International career
Hackshaw made his debut in the Under-20 squad on 10 January 2015.

Hackshaw made his debut for Trinidad and Tobago national football team on 27 March 2015. He came in as a substitute for Tobago-born Kevan George in the one-legged Copa América Centenario qualifying play-offs in the 78th minute where he played against Haiti. However only 5 minutes after Hackshaw came into the line-up T&T conceded the only goal of the match.

References

External links

1995 births
Living people
Trinidad and Tobago footballers
Trinidad and Tobago international footballers
North East Stars F.C. players
Charleston Battery players
TT Pro League players
USL Championship players
2015 CONCACAF U-20 Championship players
Trinidad and Tobago under-20 international footballers
Association football midfielders
Indy Eleven players
2019 CONCACAF Gold Cup players
Footballers at the 2015 Pan American Games